Dame Diana Ruth Johnson  (born 25 July 1966) is a British politician who has served as the Member of Parliament (MP) for Kingston upon Hull North since the 2005 general election. A member of the Labour Party, she was elected as Chair of the Home Affairs Select Committee on 15 December 2021, replacing Yvette Cooper. 

During the Brown ministry, she served as Parliamentary Under Secretary of State for Schools in the Department for Children, Schools and Families, as well as being an Assistant Government Whip.

Early life
Johnson was born in Northwich, Cheshire. After returning from wartime service in the Navy her father, Eric Johnson, founded the Eric Johnson electrical engineering company in Little Leigh near Northwich, Cheshire (now continued by his son). She passed the Eleven plus and attended the Northwich County Grammar School for Girls (later the County High School Leftwich). At sixth form level she studied at Sir John Deane's College from 1982 to 1984 where she studied History, English and Economics.

She gained an LLB in Law from Queen Mary University of London. She became a barrister in 1991. From 1999 to 2005, she was a Barrister in Law at Paddington Law Centre.

Johnson was a councillor in the London Borough of Tower Hamlets from 1994 to 2002, serving as Chair of Social services. She became a member of the London Assembly on 1 March 2003 after the resignation of Trevor Phillips who became chair of the Commission for Racial Equality, having been next on the list of London-wide members at the 2000 election. She did not stand for re-election in 2004.

Parliamentary career
She stood unsuccessfully in Brentwood and Ongar at the 2001 general election.

At the May 2005 general election, she was elected Labour Member of Parliament for the Kingston upon Hull North constituency, succeeding veteran Labour MP Kevin McNamara. She is Hull's first female MP.

In November 2005 Johnson was appointed as a Parliamentary Private Secretary to the Minister of State for Pensions Reform, Stephen Timms. In 2007 she left this role to become an assistant Government Whip. She took on the additional role of Parliamentary Under Secretary of State for Schools in the reshuffle of June 2009.

During the United Kingdom parliamentary expenses scandal it was revealed that Johnson had claimed £987 in architects fees for her second home, which she voluntarily repaid, and had a £563 claim for crockery rejected as "excessive"

In the 2010 general election Johnson polled 39.2% of the vote and held onto the Hull North constituency for Labour with her majority reduced to 641 votes.

In 2014, Johnson proposed a Bill under the Ten Minute Rule that would require sex and relationships education, including discussions around issues such as consent, to be made a compulsory part of the National Curriculum

Johnson was appointed in September 2015 by Jeremy Corbyn, shortly after he became Labour party leader, as a shadow minister in the Foreign and Commonwealth team. In late June 2016, along with colleagues, she resigned as a shadow minister, unhappy at Corbyn's leadership following the 'leave' vote in the European membership referendum. She supported Owen Smith in the 2016 Labour Party leadership election.

She is co-chair of the APPG on Haemophilia and Contaminated Blood, campaigned on the Contaminated Blood Scandal and, in November 2018, received the Political Studies Association's 'Backbencher of the Year' award in recognition of her efforts.

In September 2019, Johnson became the first Labour MP to face a full reselection process by her local party after members voted that she should face a challenge. On 25 October 2019, Johnson's local party voted by 292 votes to 101 to reselect her as the candidate for the next election. She was re-elected in the 2019 general election.

Political positions

Prostitution 
On 9 December 2020, Johnson introduced a Ten Minute Rule bill that would introduce the Nordic model approach to prostitution, which would criminalise those paying for sex and criminalise websites which advertise prostitution. The bill was strongly criticised and opposed by sex workers including the English Collective of Prostitutes group, women's rights organisations, trade unions, Amnesty International and thousands of individuals, who argued that this legislation would push the industry underground and put sex workers in danger.

Israel 
In September 2020, Johnson was appointed a vice-chair of Labour Friends of Israel.

In November 2021, Johnson in the Jewish News wrote an article supporting a speech by Keir Starmer that opposed the BDS of Israel. She said "Rejecting anti-Zionist antisemitism means opposing the BDS movement which demonises and delegitimises Israel, singling it out for boycotts and sanctions."

Abortion 

In July 2021, Diana Johnson proposed an amendment that would liberalise abortion in England and Wales. Proponents of the amendment suggested this would bring English and Welsh law in line with recent legislative changes in Northern Ireland. However, Johnson was strongly criticised for not clarifying whether this would allow for abortion up until birth. It has also been suggested by self described pro-life organisations that this would have removed the requirement for a doctor to be involved, allow for sex selective abortion and removed conscience protections for those medical professionals who object to abortion. 

Johnson was also criticised by 800 medical professionals in a letter that suggested such an amendment would remove legal safeguards for both the mother and child and pointed out that extensions to the 24 week limit were only supported by 1% of the UK population according to a recent Savanta ComRes poll. Johnson received no support in Parliament for the amendment and was also criticised by pro-choice politicians. Johnson declined to take the amendment to a vote.

Brexit 
Johnson supported the indicative Parliamentary votes on Brexit and her local paper Hull Live reported that she had been threatened along with fellow Hull MP Emma Hardy on social media with being “shot and hanged” for this position.

Votes at 16 
In 2017, Johnson co-sponsored a Bill in Parliament that would have granted 16-year-olds the right to vote in Parliamentary elections.

Honours 
Johnson was appointed Dame Commander of the Order of the British Empire (DBE) in the 2020 New Year Honours for charitable and political service, in part for her campaigning on contaminated blood transfusions. She was appointed to the Privy Council on 10 March 2021.

References

External links
  Diana Johnson MP's website official site
 The Labour Party - Diana Johnson MP official biography
 
 Guardian Unlimited Politics - Ask Aristotle: Diana Johnson MP
 BBC Politics

News items
 Selected for the seat in February 2004

1966 births
Living people
Labour Party (UK) MPs for English constituencies
Female members of the Parliament of the United Kingdom for English constituencies
Labour Members of the London Assembly
Councillors in the London Borough of Tower Hamlets
Alumni of Brunel University London
People from Northwich
21st-century British women politicians
UK MPs 2005–2010
UK MPs 2010–2015
UK MPs 2015–2017
UK MPs 2017–2019
UK MPs 2019–present
Dames Commander of the Order of the British Empire
Members of the Privy Council of the United Kingdom
21st-century English women
21st-century English people
Women councillors in England